The Forge Valley Line was a 16 mile long branch of the North Eastern Railway between Seamer (near Scarborough, North Yorkshire) and Pickering. The line was intended to link Scarborough with Pickering. It opened in 1882 and closed in 1950, with the exception of a stretch from Pickering to Thornton Dale which remained open for quarry traffic until 1963.

The line did not pass through Forge Valley, but the station in the village of West Ayton was named after it to avoid confusion with another station—Great Ayton—already owned by the North Eastern Railway.

History
A railway running east/west across the Vale of Pickering, was first proposed in 1864. This intent was that this line would actually travel up the Forge Valley and connect with a line between Whitby and Scarborough at Scalby. However, due to local land owners objecting and the fact that the railway between Whitby and Scarborough had not been built, the idea was scrapped.

This route was opened on 1 May 1882. Earlier bills that had passed through Parliament had become known as Forge Valley because of the route they would take up the valley rather than across it.

The line ran quite close to the Pickering to Scarborough Road (now the A170) and some of its stations were some distance from the villages that it claimed to serve. As a consequence, the rural bus service that started up in the 20th century took patronage away from the line and despite using steam railcars and push-pull trains, the passenger numbers dropped.

The line closed to passengers completely in June 1950, with closure to all traffic between Thornton Dale and Seamer at the same time. This last section was removed in January 1963.

The route
The line covered , or  if the last  from Seamer station to Scarborough station are included, and was single track throughout with a passing loop at Snainton. It had no major engineering works or gradients of note, with only a few sections steeper than 1 in 100.

Post closure
Thornton Dale, Ebberston, Snainton, Sawdon and Wykeham have now been restored and there are three Camping Coaches at Ebberston.

Wykeham also survives and there are plans to restore the station itself. Whilst the other stations on the line are completely restored, Forge Valley is now currently in use by North Yorkshire County Council as a road and highways depot.

References

External links
Further Information about the Forge Valley Line

Closed railway lines in Yorkshire and the Humber
Rail transport in North Yorkshire
Railway lines opened in 1882